Taweethapisek School is located in Bangkok Yai District, Bangkok, Thailand, in the Thonburi area. The school was founded by King Chulalongkorn (Rama V) on 19 July 1895. It has facilities such as basketball and table-tennis as well as a 400-metre running track around the football field. As of 2013 there are about 3,000 students. Most of the students are Thai and mostly Buddhist, while other students follow other religions, including Hinduism, Islam, and Christianity.

History 

Taweethapisek School was established on July 19, 1895 by King Rama V. To celebrate this special occasion, King Rama V wanted to establish a school in honor of his grandfather, King Rama II. He donated 2,000,000 baht and persuaded the royal members to donate to build the school at Wat Arun Ratchawararam, the royal temple of King Rama II.

King Rama V named the school "Taweethapisek". In Thai, Tawee means twice or double and pisek means coronation. When the school started, there were 162 students and 6 teachers. The first school building was 4 stories high and the first director was Khun Uparakansilapaset.

In 1951, the school started to move some students to study at a new location at Wat Nakklang because the school building at Wat Arun was too small for the increasing number of students. In 1960, the school building at Wat Nakklang was finished, and all the students in grades 7–12 were moved that year.

Buildings

Bidyalabh Pruethidhada Building 
 The oldest building; 14 classrooms

Surachai Ronnarong Building 
 15 classrooms, 3 computer rooms, and a library named "Arthon Sangkhawattana"

Prabparapak Building 
 Art rooms and a gym

Thep Sittinayok Building 
 Science operation room, Pet-Dok-Kaw room (Audiovisual Education), and Green room (Eco energy prototype classroom)

General Suchinda Kraprayoon Hall Building 
 Foreign language classroom and General Suchinda Kraprayoon Hall

100th Taweethapisek anniversary by General Suchinda Kraprayoon Building 

 Taweethapisek Museum

Sacred places 
 The King Rama V Monument was brought to school on 19 June 1999 from the fine arts department.
 Phra Buddha Taweethapisek Mahamongkol Statue
 Father Surachai Ronarong Statue, honoring a famous soldier who protected Bangkok from attack by Burma during the reign of King Rama I.

School Symbol 
On the coronation day of King Rama V, Taweethapisek coins were given to the royal members and bureaucrats who came to join the Taweethapisek ceremony. Thus, the school uses the coin as the school symbol. In the school symbol, there are coats of arms of King Rama II, King Rama V, and other insignias that represent them.

Directors

Alumni 
Following are some notable alumni:

 Professor Sanya Dharmasakti, 12th Prime Minister of Thailand
 General Suchinda Kraprayoon, 19th Prime Minister of Thailand
 Air Chief Marshal Chalermkiat Wattanangkun, 5th Commander-in-Chief of the Royal Thai Air Force
 Admiral Kawee Singha, 26th Commander-in-Chief, Royal Thai Navy
 Police General Seripisut Temiyavet, 5th Commissioner-General, Royal Thai Police
 General Preecha Rojanasen, National Assembly of Thailand member
 Naowarat Pongpaiboon, S.E.A. Write Award-winning poet and national artist
 Niwat Kongpien, writer and art critic
 Puchong Yothapitak, actor, Thai pop singer and television host
 Touch Na Takuatung, Thai pop singer and actor
 Samapol Piyapongsiri, D.J. and actor
 Ong-Art Singlumpong, film director
 Atichart Chumnanon, actor
 Rangsan Viwatchaichok, Thailand national football team player

References

External links 
 

Educational institutions established in 1895
Schools in Bangkok
Boys' schools in Thailand
Bangkok Yai district
1895 establishments in Siam